Pleopsidium is a genus of lichenized fungi in the family Acarosporaceae. The widespread genus, which contains four species, was circumscribed by lichenologist Gustav Wilhelm Körber in 1855.

References

External links

Acarosporales
Lecanoromycetes genera
Lichen genera
Taxa named by Gustav Wilhelm Körber